Albert Charles Richards (18 July 1903 – 1973) was an English professional footballer who played as a centre forward and outside right in the Football League for Gillingham and Brentford. He had a particular affiliation with hometown Kent League club Chatham Town, whom he served in three spells.

Career statistics

References

1903 births
1973 deaths
Sportspeople from Chatham, Kent
Footballers from Kent
Association football outside forwards
English footballers
Brentford F.C. players
Chatham Town F.C. players
Charlton Athletic F.C. players
Luton Town F.C. players
Gillingham F.C. players
Dartford F.C. players
English Football League players
Southern Football League players
Kent Football League (1894–1959) players